Killing Puritans is the fourth studio album by Armand van Helden released in 2000. It was released as CD and as quadruple vinyl.

Controversy
The album's cover art prominently featured an African child soldier, prone, and aiming a rifle. The image was controversial enough to threaten the album to be banned worldwide. Eventually, UK versions of the album were sold in a plain brown cardboard sleeve that concealed the offending image.

Track listing

Critical reception
Critical reception to the album was varied, with coverage ranging from mostly positive, to mixed to significantly negative.

A reviewer for AllMusic felt that the music was better suited to nightclubs rather than personal listening, with heavy club themes alongside freestyle rapping and "diva theatrics". The music was generally considered to be an enjoyable blend of several different genres but lacking in anything to make it a true hit.

An NME review was generally positive towards the music quality of the songs played, again noting of the skill set across multiple genres. However it was criticized for its attempts to claim social relevance, particularly in relation to Armand's claims to breaks taboos, while failing to make any clear-cut social indication and is instead similar to the dance industry most criticized by the author.

A critic for LA Weekly called Killing Puritans "a very bad album, both in its politics and its sound.", indicating that the mix of genres complimented elsewhere, in fact reduced any coherence of the album rendering it as a mixture of songs - with further criticism of most of their quality.

A review in Exclaim! gave a mixed analysis of Killing Puritans. Many of the songs have their musical competence complimented "eclectic, energetic and full of attitude"; but contrasts them with stodgy performance elsewhere. Several songs come in for particular criticism lyrically as standard dance culture and not up to prior music by Armand.

Charts

Release history

References

2000 albums
Armand Van Helden albums